The Roman Catholic Diocese of Pangkal-Pinang is a diocese in the Ecclesiastical province of the metropolitan Archdiocese of Palembang on Bangka Belitung Islands in Indonesia, yet depends on the missionary Congregation for the Evangelization of Peoples.

Its cathedral episcopal see is Katedral Santo Yosep, dedicated to Saint Joseph, in the city of Pangkal-Pinang, on Bangka Island.

History 
 27 December 1923: Established as the Apostolic Prefecture of Bangka e Biliton, on territory split off from the Apostolic Prefecture of Sumatra
 8 February 1951: Promoted and renamed after its see as the Apostolic Vicariate of Pangkal-Pinang
 3 January 1961: Promoted as Diocese of Pangkal-Pinang

Statistics 
As per 2018, it pastorally served 55,421 Catholics (1.6% of 3,495,000 total) on 27,021 km2 in 17 parishes, 2 missions, with 77 priests (56 diocesan, 21 religious), 111 lay religious (27 brothers, 84 sisters), and 26 seminarians.

Ordinaries 
(all Roman Rite, so far members of missionary congregations)
 
Apostolic Prefects of Bangka e Biliton 
 Mgr Teodosio Herckenrath, Picpus Fathers,  SS.CC. born Netherlands, the colonial homeland) (18 January 1924 – death 1928)
 Mgr Vito Bouma, SS.CC. (born Netherlands) (29 May 1928 – 1945)  
 Mgr Van Soest, SS.CC. (born Netherlands) (1946-1951) as Apostolic Administrator vicar Apostolic Prefects of Bangka, Belitung and Riau

Apostolic Vicar of Pangkal-Pinang
 Nicolas Pierre van der Westen,  SS.CC. (born Netherlands) (8 February 1951 – 3 January 1961 see below), Titular Bishop of Bladia (1951.02.08 – 1961.01.03)

Suffragan Bishops of Pangkal-Pinang
 Nicolas Pierre van der Westen, SS.CC. (see above 3 January 1961 – retired 11 November 1978), died 1982
 Mgr Rolf Reichenbach, SS.CC. (born in Cologne, in 1931, death in 2004) 1979-1987 as Apostolic Administrator of Diocese of Pangkalpinang 
 Mgr Hilarius Moa Nurak, Divine Word Missionaries (S.V.D.) (born Indonesia) (30 March 1987 – death 29 April 2016)
 Mgr Yohanes Harun Yuwono Pr. (29 April 2016 – 28 June 2017) as Apostolic Administrator of Diocese of Pangkalpinang
 Mgr Adrianus Sunarko, O.F.M. (born Papua) (28 June 2017 - ...), no previous prelature.

See also 
 List of Catholic dioceses in Indonesia

References

External links

 
 GCatholic.org - data for all sections
 Catholic Hierarchy

1923 establishments in the Dutch East Indies
Bangka Belitung Islands
Christian organizations established in 1923
Roman Catholic dioceses and prelatures established in the 20th century
Roman Catholic dioceses in Indonesia
South Sumatra